Pony Club Australia Ltd is a not for profit organisation that encourages people to ride and teaches them horsemanship and how to care for horses.

Australia has the largest Pony Club membership in the world with just under 40,000 financial members. In Australia, there are approximately 850 clubs spread over the seven states and territories. Its members are the recognised State Sporting Organisations for Pony Club in each state and the Northern Territory including Pony Club Association of New South Wales, Pony Club Association of Queensland, Pony Club Association of Victoria, Pony Club Western Australia, Pony Club Association of South Australia, Pony Club Association of Tasmania and Pony Club Association of the Northern Territory. Pony Club Australia members also include the individuals who are registered with its Member States.

Pony Club has always been the foundation of horse-riding in Australia and continues to play a pivotal role. Pony Club riders participate in diverse sports including Mounted Games and Modern Pentathlon, play polo and polocrosse, and pursue careers in the racing and broader horse industry. Pony Club members have gone on to fill the Australian Olympic equestrian teams, such as Shane Rose, Megan Jones, Wendy Schaeffer, Gill Rolton, Phillip Dutton, the Roycrofts, Stuart Tinney, Sonja Johnson, Clayton Fredericks, Edwina Tops-Alexander, Paul Tapner, Scott Keach and others. Regardless of the level of participation, Pony Club Australia emphasises education, safety, horsemanship, variety, friendship and fun.

Pony Club Australia is recognised by Sport Australia as the National Sporting Organisation for Pony Club. The Australian Government through the Australian Sports Commission recognises Pony Club Australia to develop Pony Club in Australia.

History 
The first Pony Club in Australia was formed in 1939 at Ingleburn, New South Wales. Many early Pony Clubs were affiliated with the British Horse Society Pony Club (BHSPC) and used their resources – syllabus, instruction notes, even the badges and ties.

The development of the knowledge and ability of riders was the concern of Pony Club from its foundation. The emphasis has always been:

 The safety of the rider
 The comfort of the horse
 The enjoyment of the rider
 The progress of the rider

The first Inter-Pacific Exchange was held in America during 1962 and in Western Australia in 1979. Teams participated from New Zealand, Great Britain, the Far East, Japan, Canada and Australia in the 1979 Inter-Pacific Exchange.

The Syllabus of Instruction 
Pony Club in Australia has been teaching young people to ride and care for their horses since 1939.

Structure 
Pony Clubs are arranged into zones and, in turn, states.

Pony Club Australia Ltd is a company limited by guarantee, whose members are the state Pony Club associations and members of Pony Clubs across Australia.

The Patron of Pony Club Australia is Olympic rider Heath Ryan.

Qualifications 
Pony Club Australia offers qualifications in coaching and training in gear checking.

Centre membership 
Horse ownership is not possible or desirable for everyone, but it should not be a barrier to participating in equestrian sport, recreation, and activity. For the first time in its 80-year history, Pony Club Australia have made it possible for people who do not have their own horse/pony, or exclusive use of a horse/pony to advance their skills through the Pony Club Australia programme of training and education. Funded by a 2019 "Move it Aus" grant from Sport Australia, Pony Club Australia has started Centre Membership. Riders who do not have their own horse/pony, or exclusive use of a horse/pony can become Centre Members of Pony Club Australia. Centre Membership is for youth and adult riders. Centre Members can develop their skills in horse handling, riding, care, knowledge and management by working their way through the syllabus and achieving internationally-recognised Certificates of Proficiency. Participation is made possible by Centre Members riding school horses at Pony Club Accredited Riding Centres across Australia. If Centre Members purchase or sole-lease a horse, they transfer to club membership and join one of over 800 Australian pony clubs.

Disciplines and Competition 
Pony Club Australia teaches riders the skills in riding, horse care and sportsmanship that are the foundations of recreational and competitive riding. In addition to the Olympic equestrian disciplines, Pony Club riders participate in a variety of sports, including the quintessential Australian horse riding events of polocrosse, campdrafting, team penning and Stockman’s Challenge. A description of these and other sports can be found here.

In 1994 the International Mounted Games were held in the southern hemisphere for the first time at Beverley, Western Australia, competing teams were from Canada, Great Britain, United States of America and Australia. 

The Australian team won the International Mounted Games in 2019 and placed second in 2017 and 2018.

In 1995 the Pony Club Association of New South Wales hosted the first Pony Club National Championships at Wagga Wagga.

The 2021 National Championships will be held in Victoria.

International teams and Inter-Pacific Championships 
In 2019 Pony Club Australia sent teams to compete in Mounted Games in the USA, Showjumping (Inter-Pacific championships) in Hong Kong and activities in China.  

Pony Club members travel with a coach and/or manager and applicants need to be resilient and capable of riding borrowed horses.

See also 

Pony Club
Pony Club Association of Victoria
Pony Club Association of New South Wales
New Zealand Pony Clubs Association
The Pony Club
United States Pony Clubs
Australian Sports Commission

References

Yates, Kelly. "Equestrian fraternity will miss a pioneer" Cranbourne News, 15 May 2008

Equestrian organizations
Sports governing bodies in Australia